Virginia Reel can refer to any of the following:

Virginia Reel (solitaire), a solitaire card game
Virginia reel (dance), a folk dance
Virginia Reel roller coaster, a type of roller coaster